"See You Tonight" is a song co-written and recorded by American country music singer Scotty McCreery. It is his fourth official single, and the first from his second studio album, also titled of the same name.

Content
Written by McCreery along with Ashley Gorley and Zach Crowell, the song is about a male who goes to visit his girlfriend because he has to "see [her] tonight," as substitutes like phone calls and pictures are not enough.

Critical reception
Giving it 3.5 stars out of 5, Billy Dukes of Taste of Country said that McCreery "has never sounded more comfortable". He also wrote that the lyrics "rely a little too heavily on overused country images like deep kisses under the moonlight to make it a Song of the Year contender, but his verses are miles from cliche." Matt Bjorke of Roughstock rated it 4 out of 5 stars, saying that the song "is youthful without feeling overtly so. The production from Frank Rogers is modern without being in your face about it. It's fresh, it's current."

Music video
Roman White directed the music video.

Chart and sales performance
The song debuted at No. 94 on the Billboard Hot 100 chart with sales of 46,000. It also entered at No 14 on the Hot Country Songs, and No. 43 on the Hot Digital Songs chart.  The song was slow to gain traction on the radio, but on the debut of the album on October 15, 2013, it re-entered the Hot 100 chart at No. 93 on the Billboard chart.  It then fell off  Hot 100 chart, but again re-entered the chart at No. 86 in December 2013 with increasing radio spins and sales.

The song was his first Top Ten hit on the country charts. On the Billboard Country Airplay chart, McCreery's song has the second-longest top 10 climb in the chart's 24-year-history at 44 weeks.  The song was certified Gold on February 14, 2014.  As of May 2014, the song has sold 693,000 copies in the US.

Charts and certifications

Weekly charts

Year-end charts

Certifications

References

2013 singles
Country ballads
2010s ballads
Mercury Records singles
Scotty McCreery songs
Songs written by Ashley Gorley
Song recordings produced by Frank Rogers (record producer)
Music videos directed by Roman White
2013 songs
Songs written by Zach Crowell
Songs written by Scotty McCreery